Myrtle Bank may refer to:

in Australia
 Myrtle Bank, South Australia
 Myrtle Bank, Tasmania

in the United Kingdom
Myrtle Bank, Little Switzerland, Douglas, Isle of Man, one of Isle of Man's Registered Buildings

in the United States
Myrtle Bank (Natchez, Mississippi), listed on the NRHP in Mississippi